Occupied Minds: A Palestinian-Israeli journey beyond hope and despair is a 2006 documentary film that was written, produced, and directed by journalists Jamal Dajani and David Michaelis. The film first released in the United States in March 2006 and centers upon the Palestinian-Israeli conflict.

Synopsis
The film follows Dajani and Michaelis as they travel to Jerusalem, their mutual birthplace. While there they investigate and interview several people on how they view their daily lives and the Palestinian-Israeli conflict. The two also try to suggest and look into several possible solutions to the conflict.

Reception
The Washington Report on Middle East Affairs praised the documentary and called it a "must see film".

PBS Frontline selected the film for its Frontline/World Rough Cut series.

References

External links
 

2006 television films
2006 films
Documentary films about the Israeli–Palestinian conflict
American documentary television films
2000s American films